Pizzo Stella or Pizzo Sterla is a mountain of Lombardy, Italy, located north of Chiavenna. On its northern side it overlooks the Valle di Lei and the lake Lago di Lei.

References

External links
Pizzo Stella on Hikr
Pizzo Stella on Summitpost

Mountains of the Alps
Alpine three-thousanders
Mountains of Lombardy